is a Japanese footballer who plays for Vonds Ichihara from 2023.

Career 

On 23 December 2022, Watanabe joined to Kantō club part of JRL, Vonds Ichihara for upcoming 2023 season.

Career statistics 

Updated to the end 2022 season.

Club

References

External links

Profile at Renofa Yamaguchi

1986 births
Living people
Association football people from Chiba Prefecture
Japanese footballers
J1 League players
J2 League players
J3 League players
Vegalta Sendai players
Montedio Yamagata players
Renofa Yamaguchi FC players
Thespakusatsu Gunma players
Vonds Ichihara players
Association football defenders